Belogorsky is a rural locality (a settlement) and the administrative center of Belogorskoye Rural Settlement of Kholmogorsky District, Arkhangelsk Oblast, Russia. The population was 648 as of 2010. There are 3 streets.

Geography 
Belogorsky is located on the Pinega River, 50 km east of Kholmogory (the district's administrative centre) by road. Palenga is the nearest rural locality.

References 

Rural localities in Kholmogorsky District